Thongsavanh Phomvihane (born 9 August 1964) is a Laotian politician and member of the Lao People's Revolutionary Party (LPRP). He currently serves as Head of the LPRP Central Committee External Relations Committee, and is a member of the 11th Central Committee.

Career
He has worked in the Ministry of Foreign Affairs since 1991. He was appointed Deputy Director General of the International Organizations Department in 1993, and served as Acting Director General of the International Organizations Department in 1993–95. He began working on China–Laos relations in the late 19990s as Political Counsellor and Deputy Head of Mission of the Embassy to China. His first political office came in 2003 when he was appointed Ambassador to Russia, and was officially accredited ambassador to Belarus, Ukraine and Kazakhstan as well. In 2009 he started working in the party's External Relations Committee, and was appointed Deputy Head of the External Relations Committee in 2012 and served until 2015 when he was transferred to the Ministry of Foreign Affairs as Deputy Minister of Foreign Affairs. Later in June 2015 he was appointed Ambassador to Vietnam and served until 2019 when he was yet again appointed Deputy Minister of Foreign Affairs. Two years later, in 2021, he was appointed Head of the party's External Relations Committee.

Family
Phomvihane is the son of former party General Secretary of the Central Committee Kaysone Phomvihane and Central Committee member Thongvin Phomvihane. He has three brothers; Saysomphone, Santiphab and Sanyahak (died on 17 July 2013).

References

Bibliography 
Books:
 

Living people
Members of the 11th Central Committee of the Lao People's Revolutionary Party
Place of birth missing (living people)
1964 births